Ilfak Guilfanov (born 1966) is a software developer, computer security researcher and blogger. He became well known when he issued a free hotfix for the Windows Metafile vulnerability on 31 December 2005.  His unofficial patch was favorably reviewed and widely publicized because no official patch was initially available from Microsoft.   Microsoft released an official patch on 5 January 2006.

Guilfanov was born in a small village in the Tatarstan Region of Russia in a Volga Tatar family. He graduated from Moscow State University in 1987 with a Bachelor of Science in Mathematics.  He lives in Liège, Belgium and works for Hex-Rays.  He is the systems architect and main developer for IDA Pro, which is Hex-Rays' commercial version of the Interactive Disassembler Guilfanov created.  A freeware version of this reverse engineering tool is also available.

References

External links
 http://www.hex-rays.com
 Interview on CNET

1966 births
Living people
Russian computer programmers
Moscow State University alumni
Computer security specialists